Senator Sleeper may refer to:

Albert Sleeper (1862–1934), Michigan State Senate
John Sherburne Sleeper (1794–1878), Massachusetts State Senate